ABSD-6 is an advanced base sectional dock which was constructed of nine advance base docks (ABD) sections for the US Navy as an auxiliary floating drydock for World War II. ABSD-6 was built by Mare Island Naval Shipyard at Vallejo, California. ABSD-6 was commissioned on 28 September 1944. Advance Base Sectional Dock-6 (Auxiliary Floating Dock Big-6) was constructed in sections during 1942 and 1943. Each section are 3,850 tons and are 93 feet long each. Each Section had a 165 feet beam, a 75 feet molded depth and had 10,000 tons lifting capacity each. There were 4 ballast compartments in each section. With all nine sections joined, she was  825 feet long, 28 feet tall (keel to welldeck), and with an inside clear width of 133 feet 7 inches. ABSD-2 had a traveling 15-ton capacity crane with an 85-foot radius and two or more support barges. The two side walls were folded down under tow to reduce wind resistance and lower the center of gravity.

World War II
Commissioned as USS ABSD-6 on 28 September 1944,  ABSD-6 was assigned to the Asiatic-Pacific Theater. ABSD-6 was towed in sections to the Naval Base Guam at Apra Harbor in Guam, Marianas Islands. After assembling she was placed in service to repair ships at Guam with her sister ship USS ABSD-3. On an island in the harbor at Guam the Navy built a base to support the crew of ABSD-6 and ABSD-3. At the base were supplies, movie theater, mess hall, Officers Clubs, movie theater, and Enlisted club and more. The base was built mostly with quonset huts. The largest repairs at Guam was that of the battleship USS South Dakota (BB-57) in May 1945. South Dakota was at Guam with ABSD-6 from 11 to 29 May 1945. Due to South Dakotas 36.3 ft (11.1 m) draft with a full load, the battleship had to unload much of her ammunition and fuel oil before entering AFDB-6. Able to lift 90,000 tons ABSD-6 could raise large ships like, aircraft carriers, battleships, cruisers, and large auxiliary ships, out the water for repair below the ship's waterline. She was also used to repair multiple smaller ships at the same time. Ships in continuous use during war need repair both from wear and from war damage from naval mine and torpedoes. Rudders and propellers are best serviced on dry docks. Without ABSD-6 and her sister ships, at remote locations months could be lost in a ships returning to a home port for repair. ABSD-6 had power stations, ballast pumps, repair shops, machine shops, and could be self-sustaining. ABSD-6 had two rail track moveable cranes able to lift tons of material and parts for removing damage parts and install new parts. 
Some of the ships repaired by ABSD-6 at Guam:
 USS LCI-80 Landing Craft Infantry
 USS LCI-449 
 USS LST-643 29 May 1945 Landing Ship, Tank
 USS LST-759 29 May 1945
 USS LST-646  29 May 1945
 USS LST-662  29 May 1945
 USS LSM-32 Landing Ship Medium
 USS LCI-992
  May 1945
  June 1945
   July 1945
 USS LSM-112 27 July 1945
 USS LSM-334 27 July 1945
 USS LSM-426
  August 1945
  August 1945 
 USS LSM-279 15 January 1946
 USS LSM-491
 USS LSM-308
 USS LSM-27 
 USS LSM-348
 USS LSM-85

Post war
ABSD-6 was decommissioned on 29 June 1946 and laid up in the US Navy Reserve Fleet. ABSD-6 was re-designated Large Auxiliary Floating Dry Dock AFDB-6. AFDB-6 was sold for scrap on 1 January 1976 by the Defense Reutilization and Marketing Service.

References

External links 
 Youtube, BATTLESHIP USS IDAHO REPAIRED AT ESPIRITU SANTO in 1944 in USS Artisan (ABSD-1)1
 Youtube, August 15, 1944 mighty battleship Idaho at ABSD-1
 Youtube, Floating Dry Docks WWII

World War II auxiliary ships of the United States
1944 ships
Floating drydocks of the United States Navy